Kledis Hida (born 26 March 2001) is an Albanian professional footballer who currently play as a centre-back for Albanian club FK Kukësi.

References

2001 births
Living people
People from Elbasan
People from Elbasan County
Albanian footballers
Association football defenders
Kategoria Superiore players
Kategoria e Parë players
KF Vëllaznimi players
Football Superleague of Kosovo players
FK Kukësi players